Einat Arif-Galanti (born 1975) is an Israeli visual artist, mainly known for her photographic and video works.

Biography
Arif-Galanti was born in 1975 in Jerusalem, Israel. Between the years 1995 and 1998 she studied in the Applied Photography Department of the Hadassah Academic College, Jerusalem. She went on to win two consecutive America-Israel Cultural Foundation Photography Scholarships, in 1998 and 1999. In 2002 she studied drawing and painting at The Jerusalem Studio School led by Israel Hershberg, an institution that follows a traditional approach to figurative art. In 2004 she co-founded the Agripas 12 cooperative gallery in Jerusalem, together with her husband Yossi Galanti and other artists.

Arif-Galanti is a lecturer at Pardes High-Art School in Givat Washington. She exhibited 10 solo exhibitions and participated in numerous group exhibitions worldwide, among them at: The Israel Museum, Herzliya Museum of Contemporary Art,  The City Museum of Collegno, Torino, Haifa Museum of Art, and Kiyosato Museum of Photographic Arts, Japan. In 2013 she received the Pais Israel Lottery Council for Culture and Arts grant and in 2018 Israeli Ministry of Culture and Sport prize for the Encouragement of Creativity. Her work is included in various private and public collections. She is and author in Untitled magazine and shares a studio at Art Cube Artists' Studios, Jerusalem. Her work is in the collection of the Kiyosato Museum of Photographic Arts, Japan.

References

External links
 Artist’s section in Untitled Magazine
 Einat Arif-Galanti at the Information Center for Israeli Art, Israel Museum
 Einat Arif-Galanti on Artsy
 Einat Arif-Galanti on TheArtLab

1975 births
Living people
21st-century Israeli women artists
Israeli photographers
Israeli installation artists
Israeli video artists
Israeli contemporary artists